Michurinsky (masculine), Michurinskaya (feminine), or Michurinskoye (neuter) is the name of several rural localities in Russia:
Michurinsky, Altai Krai, a settlement in Rubtsovsky Selsoviet of Rubtsovsky District of Altai Krai
Michurinsky, Belgorod Oblast, a settlement in Korochansky District of Belgorod Oblast
Michurinsky, Bryansk Oblast, a settlement in Michurinsky Selsoviet of Bryansky District of Bryansk Oblast
Michurinsky, Chelyabinsk Oblast, a settlement in Michurinsky Selsoviet of Kartalinsky District of Chelyabinsk Oblast
Michurinsky, Kaliningrad Oblast, a settlement under the administrative jurisdiction of Neman Town of District Significance, Nemansky District, Kaliningrad Oblast
Michurinsky, Karachay-Cherkess Republic, a settlement in Prikubansky District of the Karachay-Cherkess Republic
Michurinsky, Iskitimsky District, Novosibirsk Oblast, a settlement in Iskitimsky District, Novosibirsk Oblast
Michurinsky, Novosibirsky District, Novosibirsk Oblast, a settlement in Novosibirsky District, Novosibirsk Oblast
Michurinsky, Penza Oblast, a settlement in Michurinsky Selsoviet of Penzensky District of Penza Oblast
Michurinsky, Rostov Oblast, a settlement in Pobedenskoye Rural Settlement of Volgodonskoy District of Rostov Oblast
Michurinsky, Tyumen Oblast, a settlement in Zavodoukovsky District of Tyumen Oblast
Michurinsky, Volgograd Oblast, a settlement in Michurinsky Selsoviet of Kamyshinsky District of Volgograd Oblast
Michurinsky, Ertilsky District, Voronezh Oblast, a settlement under the administrative jurisdiction of Ertilskoye Urban Settlement, Ertilsky District, Voronezh Oblast
Michurinsky, Paninsky District, Voronezh Oblast, a settlement in Mikhaylovskoye Rural Settlement of Paninsky District of Voronezh Oblast
Michurinskoye, Altai Krai, a selo in Michurinsky Selsoviet of Khabarsky District of Altai Krai
Michurinskoye, Gusevsky District, Kaliningrad Oblast, a settlement under the administrative jurisdiction of Gusev Town of District Significance, Gusevsky District, Kaliningrad Oblast
Michurinskoye, Nesterovsky District, Kaliningrad Oblast, a settlement in Chistoprudnensky Rural Okrug of Nesterovsky District of Kaliningrad Oblast
Michurinskoye, Khabarovsk Krai, a selo in Khabarovsky District of Khabarovsk Krai
Michurinskoye, Leningrad Oblast, a logging depot settlement in Michurinskoye Settlement Municipal Formation of Priozersky District of Leningrad Oblast